Out for Blood is the fourth studio album by Unit:187, released on October 5, 2010 by Vendetta Music.

Reception
Fredrik Croona of Brutal Resonance criticized the vocal performances on Out for Blood as being lackluster and said "what this band lacks are really good synthesizer melodies to support the heavily distorted guitars and the blasting drumbeats." Connexion Bizarre called Out for Blood "a powerful album, brimming with emotional performances" and "a wonderful throwback to the golden age of industrial rock: for someone whose musical upbringing was centred around the likes of Ministry, Stiff Miners, Die Krupps, Klute and so forth, it's nothing short of sublime." Trubie Turner of ReGen awarded the album three out of five stars, saying "despite its impressive production and composition, Out for Blood definitely suffers from a tendency to blend together due to its lack of divergence in tempo and gives an overall feeling of being stuck in one gear the entire time" and its "an impressive, heavy, and gritty coldwave showcase that unfortunately comes across as too restrained."

Track listing

Personnel
Adapted from the Out for Blood liner notes.

Unit:187
 Tod Law – lead vocals, programming, production
 John Morgan – programming, keyboards, arrangements, production
 Ross Redhead – guitar, bass guitar, production

Additional personnel
 Jared Slingerland – additional guitar (9)
 Kerry Vink – additional vocals (8)

Production and design
 Chris Peterson – programming, keyboards, noises, production
 Dave Dutton – photography
 Liam Hayes – cover art, design
 Ken Marshall – additional production, mixing
 Greg Reely – mastering

Release history

References

External links 
 Capital Punishment at Bandcamp
 Capital Punishment at Discogs (list of releases)

2010 albums
Unit:187 albums